Zabcikville is an unincorporated community in eastern Bell County, Texas, with a population of about 40 according to a 1990 estimate. It is located within the Killeen-Temple-Fort Hood metropolitan area.

History
The town is named for the Zabcik (Žabčik) family, immigrants from Ratiboř in the Zlín Region of Moravia, Czech Republic. When the Zabciks immigrated to Texas in 1855, Ratiboř was part of the Austrian Empire. It was founded by Czechs in the late 19th century and was originally named Marekville after storeowners surnamed Marek and their family. The Zabcik family (one of them named John) married into the Marek family and handed their store over to them. As a result, its name was changed to Zabcikville. It had a population of 60 in 1940 and had three businesses. It went up to 80 residents and gained another business in 1949 but declined throughout the rest of the century. Its population was 38 from 1990 through 2000. The community's local store, with the Zabcikville sign on it, was still in operation at that time. The community's sign stands above a gas station in the community.

Zabcikville is known for Green's Sausage House, that serves as a restaurant and a store for residents and people passing through. Zabcikville is also known for D&M Community Grain L.L.C., that serves as a buyer of commodities for the local farmers. It is one of the two remaining buildings in the community and can reach a population of 80 on any given Sunday.

Geography

Education
Today, Zabcikville is served by the Rogers Independent School District.

References

Czech communities in the United States
Unincorporated communities in Texas
Unincorporated communities in Bell County, Texas